Supreme Injustice: How the High Court Hijacked Election 2000 is a book by Alan Dershowitz. Dershowitz criticized  the U.S. Supreme Court's 5–4 majority decision as partisan in Bush v. Gore, which ended the Florida election recount.

Dershowitz also said that the majority justices "shamed themselves and the Court on which they serve, and...defiled their places in history" and called the decision "the most perverse misuse of the Equal Protection Clause I've seen in my 40 years of law."

See also
Unprecedented: The 2000 Presidential Election – documentary featuring Dershowitz 
Bush v. Gore

External links
 Kamiya, Gary. Against the law. 4 July 2001. Salon.com.

2001 non-fiction books
Books about the 2000 United States presidential election
Alan Dershowitz